Bryan Jair Canela Mestanza (born 20 March 1994) is a Peruvian footballer who plays as a midfielder for Deportivo Garcilaso. Besides Peru, he has played in Equatorial Guinea.

References

1994 births
Living people
Peruvian footballers
People from Lima Region
Association football midfielders
Peruvian Primera División players
Club Alianza Lima footballers
Academia Deportiva Cantolao players
Peruvian Segunda División players
Deportivo Coopsol players
Futuro Kings FC players
Peruvian expatriate footballers
Peruvian expatriate sportspeople in Equatorial Guinea
Expatriate footballers in Equatorial Guinea
Deportivo Garcilaso players